Stewart J. Bailey was a member of the Wisconsin State Assembly.

Biography
Bailey was born on February 13, 1838, reports have differed on the location. During the American Civil War, he served with the 9th Regiment Illinois Volunteer Cavalry of the Union Army. Additionally, he would serve in what is now the Wisconsin Army National Guard. Bailey died on June 28, 1910 in Menomonie, Wisconsin.

Political career
Bailey was elected to the Assembly in 1888. Previously, he was a member of the city council of Menomonie from 1884 to 1886. He was a Republican.

References

External links
Wisconsin Genealogy Trails

1838 births
1910 deaths
People from Menomonie, Wisconsin
Republican Party members of the Wisconsin State Assembly
Wisconsin city council members
Wisconsin National Guard personnel
Union Army soldiers
People of Illinois in the American Civil War
Military personnel from Wisconsin
19th-century American politicians